"" ("Lonely men") is a 1990 song composed by Roby Facchinetti  and Valerio Negrini and performed by the Italian musical group Pooh.  The song won the 40th edition of the Sanremo Music Festival, where it was also performed in an English-language  soul adaptation titled "Angel of the Night" by Dee Dee Bridgewater. 
 
The song has been described as "built on a simple structure and on a measured and almost minimal arrangement".

Track listing

   7" single 
 "" (Roby Facchinetti, Valerio Negrini)
 "" (Roby Facchinetti)

Charts

References

1990 singles
Italian songs
1990 songs
Sanremo Music Festival songs
Compagnia Generale del Disco singles
Songs written by Roby Facchinetti